The Homeland Security Subcommittee on Cybersecurity, Infrastructure Protection and Innovation is a subcommittee within the House Homeland Security Committee. Established in 2007 as a new subcommittee, it handles many of the duties of the former Commerce Subcommittee on Economic Security, Infrastructure Protection, and Cybersecurity.

Members, 117th Congress

Historical membership rosters

115th Congress

116th Congress

External links
 Official Site

Homeland Cybersecurity
2007 establishments in Washington, D.C.